The Treaty of Hanover was concluded on 3 July 1710, during the Great Northern War. It allied the Russian Empire with Brunswick-Lüneburg (Hanover). Though Hanover was not among the most important states of the Holy Roman Empire, the alliance was important since the Hanoveranian duke, with whom the alliance was concluded, was subsequently to become king of Great Britain as George I.

Sources

External links
Scan of the treaty at IEG Mainz

Hanover
1710 treaties
Treaties of the Russian Empire
Treaties of the Electorate of Brunswick-Lüneburg
1710 in Europe
Bilateral treaties of Russia